There have been a number of 18th Divisions in the history of the United States Army:

Pre-World War I
 18th Division: A National Guard division established in early 1917 consisting of Arkansas, Louisiana, and Mississippi. By the end of that same year, the 18th Division became the 39th Division (later the 39th Infantry Division).

World War I
 18th Division (World War I): Organized in 1918 as a regular army and national army division for World War I, the 18th Division did not go overseas and demobilized in February 1919 at Camp Travis, Texas. Either of these two divisions would have included the 35th Infantry Brigade and the 36th Infantry Brigade.

Order of battle
Division commander: Colonel James H. Frier (interim), August 21, 1918-September 15, 1918; Brigadier General George H. Estes, September 16, 1918-October 14, 1918; Colonel James H. Frier (interim), October 14, 1918-October 23, 1918; Brigadier General Frederick B. Shaw, October 24, 1919-October 26, 1918; Brigadier General George H. Estes, October 27, 1919-February 14, 1919.

Commander, 35th Infantry Brigade: Colonel Robert C. Williams (interim), August 25, 1918-September 16, 1918; Brigadier General George H. Estes, September 16, 1918-October 13, 1918; Colonel Josephus S. Cecil, October 14, 1918-October 26, 1918; Brigadier General George H. Estes, October 27, 1918-February 14, 1919.

Commander, 36th Infantry Brigade: Colonel James H. Frier (interim), August 21, 1918-October 23, 1918; Brigadier General Frederick B. Shaw (October 24, 1918-February 6, 1919; Colonel James H. Frier, February 7, 1919-February 14, 1919.

World War II
 18th Armored Division: Placed on rolls for World War II, the 18th Armored Division was never organized.
 18th Airborne Division: a "phantom" division in World War II.

References

United States Army divisions of World War I
Military units and formations established in 1917
Military units and formations disestablished in 1919